Windy Peak is an  mountain summit located in Okanogan County in Washington state. It is part of the Okanogan Range which is a sub-range of the North Cascades and Cascade Range. The nearest higher peak is Haystack Mountain,  to the northwest in Canada. Precipitation runoff from Windy Peak drains into tributaries of the Methow River and Similkameen River.

Climate

Most weather fronts originate in the Pacific Ocean, and travel northeast toward the Cascade Mountains. As fronts approach the North Cascades, they are forced upward by the peaks of the Cascade Range, causing them to drop their moisture in the form of rain or snowfall onto the Cascades (Orographic lift). As a result, the west side of the North Cascades experiences higher precipitation than the east side, especially during the winter months in the form of snowfall. During winter months, weather is usually cloudy, but, due to high pressure systems over the Pacific Ocean that intensify during summer months, there is often little or no cloud cover during the summer.

Geology

The North Cascades features some of the most rugged topography in the Cascade Range with craggy peaks, spires, ridges, and deep glacial valleys. Geological events occurring many years ago created the diverse topography and drastic elevation changes over the Cascade Range leading to the various climate differences.

The history of the formation of the Cascade Mountains dates back millions of years ago to the late Eocene Epoch. With the North American Plate overriding the Pacific Plate, episodes of volcanic igneous activity persisted. In addition, small fragments of the oceanic and continental lithosphere called terranes created the North Cascades about 50 million years ago.

During the Pleistocene period dating back over two million years ago, glaciation advancing and retreating repeatedly scoured the landscape leaving deposits of rock debris. The "U"-shaped cross section of the river valleys are a result of recent glaciation. Uplift and faulting in combination with glaciation have been the dominant processes which have created the tall peaks and deep valleys of the North Cascades area.

See also

List of mountain peaks of Washington (state)
Geography of the North Cascades
Geology of the Pacific Northwest

References

External links
 Windy Peak weather forecast
 Windy Peak aerial photo: PBase

North Cascades
Mountains of Washington (state)
Mountains of Okanogan County, Washington
Cascade Range
North Cascades of Washington (state)